Lee Bom-so-ri is a South Korean actress. She is known for her roles in dramas such as The Miracle We Met, Justice and Link: Eat, Love, Kill.

Filmography

Television series

Theatre

Awards and nominations

References

External links 
 

1992 births
Living people
21st-century South Korean actresses
South Korean television actresses
South Korean film actresses